These species belong to Copris, a genus of dung beetles in the family Scarabaeidae.

Copris species

 Copris acutidens Motschulsky, 1860
 Copris afgoi Cambefort, 1992
 Copris agnus Sharp, 1875
 Copris algol Nguyen-phung, 1989
 Copris amabilis Kolbe, 1914
 Copris amyntor Klug, 1855
 Copris anceus (Olivier, 1789)
 Copris andrewesi Waterhouse, 1891
 Copris angusticornis Arrow, 1933
 Copris angustus Nguyen-phung & Cambefort, 1986
 Copris anomiopseoides Boucomont, 1924
 Copris antares Ferreira, 1958
 Copris arcturus Gillet, 1907
 Copris ares Zelenka, 1993
 Copris arimotoi Ochi & Araya, 1992
 Copris arizonensis Schaeffer, 1906
 Copris armatus Harold, 1869
 Copris armeniacus Faldermann, 1835
 Copris armiger Gillet, 1910
 Copris arrowi Felsche, 1910
 Copris aspericollis Gillet, 1910
 Copris atropolitus Gillet, 1910
 Copris bacchus Thunberg, 1787
 Copris barclayi Ochi, Kon & Bai, 2009
 Copris basilewskyi Ferreira, 1962
 Copris basipunctatus Balthasar, 1942
 Copris bellator Chevrolat, 1844
 Copris bengalensis Gillet, 1911
 Copris bidens Kolbe, 1893
 Copris binodis 
 Copris bootes Klug, 1855
 Copris boucardi Harold, 1869
 Copris bovinus Gillet, 1908
 Copris brachypterus Nomura, 1964
 Copris brittoni Ferreira, 1962
 Copris caelatus (Fabricius, 1794)
 Copris caliginosus Kohlmann, Cano & Delgado, 2003
 Copris cambeforti Nguyen-phung, 1988
 Copris cambodiensis Ochi, Kon & Kawahara, 2008
 Copris camerunus Felsche, 1904
 Copris caobangensis Bui, Dumack & Bonkowski, 2018 
 Copris capensis Waterhouse, 1891
 Copris cariniceps Felsche, 1910
 Copris carinicus Gillet, 1910
 Copris carmelita Fabricius, 1801
 Copris cassius Péringuey, 1901
 Copris celebensis Lansberge, 1886
 Copris cheni Ochi, Kon & Bai, 2007
 Copris chimalapensis Mora-Aguilar & Delgado, 2015
 Copris ciliatus 
 Copris colmanti Gillet, 1908
 Copris complexus Nguyen-phung, 1989
 Copris compressipennis Gillet, 1910
 Copris confucius Harold, 1877
 Copris coriarius Gillet, 1907
 Copris cornifrons Boheman, 1860
 Copris corniger Sahlberg, 1823
 Copris corpulentus Gillet, 1910
 Copris costaricensis Gahan, 1894
 Copris costariensis Matthews
 Copris crassus Deschodt & Davis, 2015
 Copris cribratus Gillet, 1927
 Copris cribricollis Gillet, 1910
 Copris curlettii Moretto, 2011
 Copris davidis (Deyrolle, 1878)
 Copris davisi Nguyen-phung & Cambefort, 1986
 Copris davisoni Waterhouse, 1891
 Copris decellei Cambefort, 1992
 Copris delicatus Arrow, 1931
 Copris denticulatus Nguyen-phung, 1988
 Copris diversus Waterhouse, 1891
 Copris draco Arrow, 1906
 Copris dracunculus Fereira, 1959
 Copris druidum Heer, 1862
 Copris dudleyi Cambefort, 1992
 Copris eburneus Cambefort, 1992
 Copris elpheneroides Felsche, 1910
 Copris elphenor Klug, 1855
 Copris erratus Lansberge, 1886
 Copris evanidus Klug, 1855
 Copris excisus Waterhouse, 1891
 Copris fallaciosus Gillet, 1907
 Copris fallax Felsche, 1910
 Copris felschei Reitter, 1892
 Copris fidius (Olivier, 1789)
 Copris frankenbergerianus Balthasar, 1958
 Copris freyi Ferreira, 1961
 Copris fricator (Fabricius, 1787)
 Copris fukiensis Balthasar, 1952
 Copris furciceps Felsche, 1910
 Copris garambae Cambefort, 1992
 Copris gazellarum Gillet, 1918
 Copris gibbulus Lansberge, 1886
 Copris gilleti Kolbe, 1907
 Copris gladiator Arrow, 1933
 Copris gopheri Hubbard, 1894
 Copris gracilis Waterhouse, 1891
 Copris graueri Kolbe, 1914
 Copris halffteri Matthews, 1959
 Copris harrisi Waterhouse, 1891
 Copris hartli Frey, 1975
 Copris hatayamai Ochi & Araya, 1992
 Copris hispanus (Linnaeus, 1764)
 Copris howdeni Matthews & Halffter, 1959
 Copris humilis Gillet, 1908
 Copris hybridus Gillet, 1910
 Copris igualensis Warner, 1990
 Copris illotus Balthasar, 1942
 Copris imitans Felsche, 1910
 Copris inaequabilis Zhang, 1997
 Copris incertus Say, 1835
 Copris inemarginatus Blatchley, 1918
 Copris inhalatus Quedenfeldt, 1884
 Copris insidiosus Péringuey, 1901
 Copris integer Reiche, 1847
 Copris interioris Kolbe, 1897
 Copris iris Sharp, 1875
 Copris jacchoides Nguyen-phung & Cambefort, 1987
 Copris jacchus (Fabricius, 1775)
 Copris jahi Nguyen-phung & Cambefort, 1986
 Copris johkii Ochi & Kon, 2014
 Copris juanmorai Mora-Aguilar & Delgado, 2015
 Copris jucundus Gillet, 1932
 Copris kachinensis Ochi, Kon & Kawahara, 2008
 Copris kartlinus Kabakov, 1988
 Copris kasagii Ochi & Kon, 1996
 Copris kasanka Josso & Prévost, 2016
 Copris katangae Cambefort & Nguyen-phung, 1996
 Copris keralensis Gill, 1986
 Copris kiuchii Masumoto, 1989
 Copris klapperichi Balthasar, 1942
 Copris klugi Harold, 1869
 Copris kusakabei Ochi, Kon & Kawahara, 2005
 Copris laeviceps Harold, 1862
 Copris laevigatus Gillet, 1927
 Copris laiiformis Nguyen-phung & Cambefort, 1987
 Copris laioides Boucomont, 1932
 Copris laius Harold, 1868
 Copris lannathai Hanboonsong & Masumoto & Ochi, 2003
 Copris leakeyorum Paulian, 1976
 Copris lecontei Matthews, 1962
 Copris leruei Josso & Prévost, 2017
 Copris lugubris Boheman, 1858
  (Linnaeus, 1758)
 Copris macacus Lansberge, 1886
 Copris macclevei Warner, 1990
 Copris macer Péringuey, 1901
 Copris maesi Ratcliffe, 1998
 Copris magicus Harold, 1881
 Copris manni Ochi, Kon & Bai, 2009
 Copris marcus Gillet, 1921
 Copris martinae Nguyen-phung, 1988
 Copris martinezi Matthews and Halffter, 1968
 Copris matthewsi Delgado & Kohlmann, 2001
 Copris medogensis Zhang, 1988
 Copris megaceratoides Waterhouse, 1891
 Copris megasoma Matthews & Halffter, 1959
 Copris mesacanthus Harold, 1878
 Copris mexicanus Matthews & Halffter, 1959
 Copris minutus (Drury, 1773)
 Copris misellus Péringuey, 1901
 Copris moechus LeConte, 1854
 Copris moffartsi Gillet, 1907
 Copris mongkhoni Hanboonsong & Masumoto & Ochi, 2003
 Copris montivagus Gillet, 1908
 Copris morphaeus Gillet, 1932
 Copris mourgliai Zelenka, 1993
 Copris neglectus Moxey, 1963
 Copris neotridens Génier & Prévost, 2017
 Copris nepos Gillet, 1908
 Copris nevinsoni Waterhouse, 1891
 Copris novaki Zelenka, 1992
 Copris nubilosus Kohlmann & Cano & Delgado, 2003
 Copris numa Lansberge, 1886
 Copris obenbergeri Balthasar, 1933
 Copris obesus Boheman, 1857
 Copris ochus (Motschulsky, 1860)
 Copris orion Klug, 1835
 Copris orphanus Guérin-Méneville, 1847
 Copris parapecuarius Ochi, Kon & Kawahara, 2008
 Copris pauliani Nguyen-phung & Cambefort, 1986
 Copris pecuarius Lewis, 1884
 Copris pedarioides Lansberge, 1886
 Copris phungae Cambefort, 1992
 Copris phylax Gillet, 1908
 Copris poggii Ochi & Kon, 2005
 Copris potanini Semenov, 1891
 Copris prevosti Josso, 2011
 Copris pristinus Pierce, 1946
 Copris pseudobootes Ferreira, 1962
 Copris pseudochus Ochi & Kon, 2004
 Copris pseudomoffartsi Moretto, 2011
 Copris pseudosinicus Balthasar, 1958
 Copris pueli Mollandin De Boissy, 1905
 Copris punctatus Gillet, 1910
 Copris puncticollis Boheman, 1857
 Copris punctipennis Boucomont, 1914
 Copris punctulatus Wiedemann, 1823
 Copris punjabensis Gillet, 1921
 Copris quasilaevigatus Ochi, Kon & Bai, 2007
 Copris ramosiceps Gillet, 1921
 Copris rebouchei Harold, 1869
 Copris remotus Leconte, 1866
 Copris renwarti Nguyen-phung & Cambefort, 1986
 Copris repertus Walker, 1858
 Copris ribbei Lansberge, 1886
 Copris riekoae Ochi & Kon, 2003
 Copris ritsemae Harold, 1875
 Copris rugosus Gillet, 1908
 Copris ruricola Balthasar, 1933
 Copris sabinus Gillet, 1910
 Copris sacontala Redtenbacher, 1848
 Copris sallei Harold, 1869
 Copris sarpedon Harold, 1868
 Copris saundersi Harold, 1869
 Copris schoolmeestersi Ochi & Kon, 2010
 Copris scorpio Zelenka, 1993
 Copris serius Nguyen-phung, 1987
 Copris sexdentatus Thunberg, 1818
 Copris siamensis Gillet, 1910
 Copris siangensis Biswas, 1980
 Copris sierrensis Matthews, 1961
 Copris signatus Walker, 1858
 Copris simonettai Cambefort, 1992
 Copris simulator Nguyen-phung & Cambefort, 1986
 Copris singularis Nguyen-phung & Cambefort, 1986
 Copris sinicus Hope, 1842
 Copris sinon (Olivier, 1789)
 Copris sodalis Walker, 1858
 Copris sonensis Bui, Dumack & Bonkowski, 2018 
 Copris sorex Balthasar, 1942
 Copris sphaeropterus Harold, 1877
 Copris spinator Harold, 1881
 Copris subdolus Balthasar, 1958
 Copris subpunctatus Gillet, 1910
 Copris subsidens Péringuey, 1901
 Copris subterraneus Heer, 1862
 Copris sumatrensis Gillet, 1921
 Copris surdus Arrow, 1931
 Copris szechouanicus Balthasar, 1958
 Copris tetraodon Gillet, 1910
 Copris tridentatus Solis & Kohlmann, 2003
 Copris tripartitus Waterhouse, 1875
 Copris truncatus Felsche, 1901
 Copris tsukamotoi Ochi, Kon & Kawahara, 2008
 Copris typhoeus Gerstaecker, 1884
 Copris uenoi Hanboonsong & Masumoto & Ochi, 2003
 Copris umbilicatus Abeille De Perrin, 1901
 Copris urus Boheman, 1857
 Copris usambaricus Gillet, 1908
 Copris vankhaii Nguyen-phung, 1988
 Copris victorini Boheman, 1857
 Copris vietnamicus Kabakov, 1994
 Copris vilhenai Ferreira, 1962
 Copris vrydaghi Ferreira, 1962
 Copris warneri Mccleve & Kohlmann, 2005
 Copris wiesei Kolbe, 1914
 Copris yangi Ochi, Kon & Bai, 2007
 Copris youngai Balthasar, 1967
 Copris zhangi Ochi, Kon & Bai, 2009

References

Copris